Wing Chung "Andy" Chang (born 26 October 1996 in Macau) is a racing driver from Macau. He is currently competing in the China Formula 4 Championship. He formerly competed in the FIA Formula 3 European Championship.

Andy Chang finished second in his home race the Macau Grand Prix twice in successive years, both times losing to Charles Leong.  

On 20 November 2022, Andy Chang won his first Macau Grand Prix.

Racing record

Career summary

References

External links
Profile at Driver Database

Macau racing drivers
1996 births
Living people
Formula Masters China drivers
British Formula Three Championship drivers
FIA Formula 3 European Championship drivers
Double R Racing drivers
Team West-Tec drivers
Fortec Motorsport drivers
T-Sport drivers
Eurasia Motorsport drivers
Karting World Championship drivers
Chinese F4 Championship drivers